Friedrich Albrecht Anton Meyer (29 June 1768 – 29 November 1795) was a German doctor and naturalist.

His academic thesis in Göttingen was Dissertatio inauguralis medico-therapeutica De cortice angusturae.

He wrote, in 1793, Systematisch-summarische Uebersicht der neuesten zoologischen Entdeckungen in Neuholland und Afrika, a work on African fauna, especially primates and birds.

His classification of reptiles, Synopsis reptilium, novam ipsorum sistens generum methodum, nec non Gottingensium huius ordinis animalium enumerationem, was published in 1795.

References

18th-century German zoologists
1768 births
1795 deaths